SLOC may refer to:

 Salt Lake Organizing Committee, the organization responsible for the 2002 Winter Olympics in Salt Lake City, Utah
 Schenectady Light Opera Company, a nonprofit community theater organization in Schenectady, New York
 Secured line of credit, a type of credit source extended to a government, business or individual by a bank or other financial institution
 security link over coax, one type of ethernet over coax
 Sea lines of communication, the primary maritime routes between ports, used for trade, logistics and naval forces
 Source lines of code, a software metric used to measure the size of a software program